Giacinto Berloco (born 31 August 1941) is an Italian prelate of the Catholic Church. He served as the Apostolic Nuncio to Belgium and to Luxembourg from 2009 to 2016.

Biography
Born in Altamura, Italy, on 31 August 1941, Giacinto Berloco was ordained to the priesthood on 19 March 1966 for the Roman Catholic Diocese of Altamura-Gravina-Acquaviva delle Fonti. Berloco obtained a Doctor of Theology degree and a licentiate in canon law.

Berloco entered the diplomatic service of the Holy See in 1972 and served in the nunciatures in Costa Rica, the Netherlands and Spain, and then in the Vatican Secretariat of State. On 5 September 1974 Pope Paul VI gave him the honorary title of Chaplain of His Holiness and on 24 June 1985 Pope John Paul II gave him the title of Honorary Prelate of His Holiness.

On 15 March 1990, Pope John Paul II appointed him Titular Archbishop of Fidenae and Apostolic Delegate to Mozambique. On 3 April he received the additional responsibility of Apostolic Pro-Nuncio to Zimbabwe.

He was consecrated bishop on 5 April 1990 by Pope John Paul, with co-consecrators Giovanni Battista Re and Justin Francis Rigali.

On 17 July 1993, Berloco was appointed Apostolic Nuncio to Costa Rica.

On 5 May 1998, Pope John Paul appointed him Apostolic Nuncio to El Salvador and Belize.

On 24 February 2005, Berloco was appointed Apostolic Nuncio in Venezuela. 

On 18 June 2009 Pope Benedict XVI appointed him Nuncio in Belgium. On 24 July 2009 he was appointed Nuncio in Luxembourg as well.

On 8 March 2017, Pope Francis appointed Berloco to a five-year term as a member of the Congregation for Bishops.

See also
 List of heads of the diplomatic missions of the Holy See

References

External links
Catholic-Hierarchy 

1941 births
Living people
21st-century Italian Roman Catholic titular archbishops
Pontifical Ecclesiastical Academy alumni
Apostolic Nuncios to Belgium
Apostolic Nuncios to Luxembourg
Apostolic Nuncios to Venezuela
Apostolic Nuncios to Mozambique
Apostolic Nuncios to Zimbabwe
Apostolic Nuncios to Costa Rica
Apostolic Nuncios to Belize
Apostolic Nuncios to El Salvador
20th-century Italian Roman Catholic titular archbishops